The 2013–14 Russian Premier League was the 22nd season of the Russian football championship since the dissolution of the Soviet Union and 12th under the current Russian Premier League name. The season started on 13 July 2013 and concluded on 17 May 2014, with a winter break between the weekends around 6 December 2013 and 6 March 2014.

CSKA Moscow were the defending champions.

Teams 

After previous season Mordovia Saransk and Alania Vladikavkaz were relegated to National Football League. They were replaced with Ural, FNL champions, and Tom Tomsk, FNL runners-up. Tom Tomsk returned to Premier League at first attempt, while Ural was absent from the top level for 16 seasons.

Personnel and sponsorship

Managerial changes

Last updated: 5 May 2014

Tournament format and regulations

Basic 
The 16 teams will play a round-robin tournament whereby each team plays each one of the other teams twice, once at home and once away. Thus, a total of 240 matches will be played, with 30 matches played by each team.

Promotion and relegation 
The teams that finish 15th and 16th will be relegated to the FNL, while the top two FNL teams will be promoted to the Premier League for the 2014/15 season.

The 13th and 14th Premier League teams will play the 4th and 3rd FNL teams respectively in two playoff games with the winner securing a Premier League spot for 2014/15 season.

Season events
On 11 May 2014, the game between FC Zenit Saint Petersburg and FC Dynamo Moscow was interrupted in the 86th minute with Dynamo leading 4-2 when Zenit fans ran out of the stands. At first they stood behind the goal line, when the referee decided to take the teams off the field into the dressing rooms and teams began to leave, one of Zenit fans punched Dynamo player Vladimir Granat. It was originally reported that Zenit player José Salomón Rondón was also attacked. Later it has been clarified that Rondón had a conflict with Dynamo player Marko Lomić, but that incident was not registered by the referee or the game inspector. The game was abandoned. Granat was diagnosed with concussion and missed Dynamo's last game of the season against Spartak Moscow. The punishment was decided on 14 May 2014 by the Control-Disciplinary Committee of the Russian Football Union. Dynamo was awarded a 3-0 win, Zenit was fined 700,000 rubles, they will play their next two home games (in the 2014-15 season) in an empty stadium, and for the additional three home games the fan stand will be empty. The Zenit fan who punched Granat, 45-year-old Aleksei Nesterov known as Gulliver, was not immediately arrested and went into hiding for several days. Eventually he gave himself up to the police and was charged with assault. The criminal charges against Nesterov were dropped in court after he reached a settlement with Granat and he was released.

League table

Relegation play-offs

First leg

Second leg

Ufa won 6–4 on aggregate score and was promoted to the 2014–15 Russian Premier League.

Torpedo Moscow won 2–0 on aggregate score and was promoted to the 2014–15 Russian Premier League.

Results

Round by round
The following table represents the teams position after each round in the competition.

Statistics

Top goalscorers

Hat-tricks

Last updated: 15 May 2014

Awards

Monthly awards

Top 33
On 7 June 2014 Russian Football Union named its list of 33 top players:

On the same day, the RFU also announced the individual awards.

Player of the year:  Seydou Doumbia (CSKA).

"Hope of the year" (under-21 players):  Aleksei Miranchuk (Lokomotiv).

Manager of the year: Leonid Slutsky (CSKA).

Referee of the year: Aleksei Nikolaev.

Team of the year: PFC CSKA Moscow.

For the contribution to the development of football: Sergey Galitsky (owner of FC Krasnodar).

References

External links 

2013–14 Russian Premier League at Soccerway

Russian Premier League seasons
1
Rus